Ratrace is a board game published by Waddingtons in 1967.

Gameplay
Ratrace is a family economic game.

Reviews
Games & Puzzles #37 and #39
Jeux & Stratégie #11

References

External links
 

Board games introduced in 1967
Waddingtons games